Paul William Romaines (born 25 December 1955) is a former English first-class cricketer who is now a teacher.

Born in Bishop Auckland, County Durham, on Christmas Day 1955, Romaines played six first-class matches for Northamptonshire in 1975 and 1976 before returning to his native Durham for five seasons of Minor Counties cricket. An opening or middle-order batsman and occasional off-spinner, he then played ten seasons with Gloucestershire from 1982 to 1991, in which he played 161 first-class matches, and one season (1984–85) in South Africa for Griqualand West. 

His 8120 first-class runs at an average of 28.39 included 13 hundreds. His best season was 1984 when he scored 1844 runs for Gloucestershire at 35.46. His highest score was his first century, 186 for Gloucestershire against Warwickshire in 1982.

Romaines is now head of PSHE, Cricket and Assistant House Master in North Town at Clifton College in Bristol.

References

External links
 
Paul Romaines at CricketArchive

1955 births
Living people
Gloucestershire cricketers
Northamptonshire cricketers
Sportspeople from Bishop Auckland
Cricketers from County Durham
English cricketers
Durham cricketers
Griqualand West cricketers
Schoolteachers from County Durham